Gradus is the shortened form of a Latin phrase which means "Steps to Parnassus".

Gradus may also refer to:

 step, an ancient Roman unit of length
 gradus deiectio, Latin for "Reduction in rank"
 Gradus Gravis affair, Latin for "Serious Degree"

People with the surname
 Kamila Gradus (born 1967), retired Polish marathon runner